Pottsboro is a town in Grayson County, Texas, United States. Its population was 2,160 at the 2010 census, up from 1,579 at the 2000 census. It is part of the Sherman–Denison metropolitan statistical area.

Geography
Texas State Highway 289 passes through the west side of the town, leading south  to Southmayd and north 10 miles to a dead end at Preston on Lake Texoma.

History

Judge James G. Thompson and Mr. James Archer Potts both owned large ranches at the future site of Pottsboro, before its inception.

Pottsboro was established in 1876 by James A. Potts, a pioneer settler who donated land for a town and a right-of-way so the Missouri–Kansas–Texas Railroad would extend its tracks westward from Denison to his settlement. The community, no doubt aided by its status as a stop on the railroad, grew rapidly for the rest of the 1800s. It incorporated in 1880 with the name "Pottsborough", and by 1885, its population had reached 200 and it supported a cotton gin, several gristmills, and a number of churches. Pottsboro suffered devastating fires that destroyed a great deal of the business section of the town: 1890, 1902, 1923, and 1924.  Father-in-law of J.A. Potts, Judge James G. Thompson, applied for a post office in 1891, when they responded, the "ugh" was dropped from the name by the federal government, and the town's name finally became "Pottsboro". A post office opened there in 1891.

The population reached 454 in 1920 and 500 in 1925. By that time, the community was served by some 25 businesses, including a bank, and by two schools with a combined enrollment of 300 students. Pottsboro declined to a population of 358 by 1936 and 312 by the mid-1940s. It then grew to 383 by 1957. The number of businesses had fallen to 12 by 1948, though by the late 1950s, it was back up to more than 20. The town began to grow again during the 1950s, perhaps spurred by the rapid expansion of nearby Denison. By 1967, Pottsboro reported 30 businesses and a population of 750, and by 1990, its population was 1,177. The population grew to 1,579 in 2000.

Demographics

2020 census

As of the 2020 United States census, there were 2,488 people, 902 households, and 598 families residing in the town.

2000 census
As of the census of 2000,  1,579 people, 586 households, and 454 families were residing in the town. The population density was 554.3 people/sq mi (213.9/km2). The 620 housing units averaged 217.6/sq mi (84.0/km2). Of the 586 households, 43.5% had children under the age of 18 living with them, 57.3% were married couples living together, 16.0% had a female householder with no husband present, and 22.5% were not families. About 19.6% of all households were made up of individuals, and 9.0% had someone living alone who was 65 years of age or older. The average household size was 2.69, and the average family size was 3.07.

In the town, the age distribution was  31.4% under 18, 6.6% from 18 to 24, 31.0% from 25 to 44, 21.6% from 45 to 64, and 9.4% who were 65 or older. The median age was 35 years. For every 100 females, there were 90.9 males. For every 100 females age 18 and over, there were 85.1 males.

The median income for a household in the town was $43,977, and for a family was $49,643. Males had a median income of $35,441 versus $24,886 for females. The per capita income for the town was $16,357. About 6.9% of families and 8.2% of the population were below the poverty line, including 10.7% of those under age 18 and 10.4% of those age 65 or over.

Climate
Pottsboro is part of a humid subtropical climate region.

Education
The town is served by the Pottsboro Independent School District.

References

Towns in Grayson County, Texas
Towns in Texas